In Greek mythology, Macris (Ancient Greek: Μακρἰς meaning "far away" or "long", a reference to the elongated shape of Euboea) was a daughter of Aristaeus and Autonoe.

Mythology 
Macris reared the young Hera in Euboea during the goddess' early childhood in some versions. One day Hera's brother Zeus stole her away, where Mount Cithaeron, in the words of Plutarch, "afforded them a shady recess". When Macris came looking for her ward, the mountain-god Cithaeron drove her away from the couple, saying that Zeus was taking his pleasure there with the goddess Leto.

Sometime later, Macris gave newborn Dionysus honey to eat on Euboea after Hermes saved him. Macris was expelled from Euboea by Hera as punishment. Macris fled to a cave on a small island where she was helped by the goddess Demeter. Demeter taught the residents of the island how to grow cereal grain. According to a scholiast commenting on verses in Argonautica, the island she fled to was subsequently named after her. Apollonius Rhodius, who composed Argonautica, only refers to the island as Drepane but he does mention its connection with Macris and Demeter. Modern Scholars have identified the island with modern Corfu, the historical Corcyra. According to Apollonius of Rhodes, the cave where Macris once lived was later the marriage chamber for Jason and Medea, and the marriage was consummated there on the Golden Fleece. Thereafter Macris's cave was called Medea's Cave.

Notes

References 
 Apollonius Rhodius, Argonautica translated by Robert Cooper Seaton (1853-1915), R. C. Loeb Classical Library Volume 001. London, William Heinemann Ltd, 1912. Online version at the Topos Text Project.
 Apollonius Rhodius, Argonautica. George W. Mooney. London. Longmans, Green. 1912. Greek text available at the Perseus Digital Library.
 Conner, Nancy. "The Everything Book of Classical Mythology" 2ed.
 Race, William H., Apollonius Rhodius: Argonautica, Loeb Classical Library (2008)

Women in Greek mythology
Dionysus in mythology
Argonautica
Deeds of Demeter
Deeds of Hera